Beverly Sassoon (born ) is a Canadian-American actress and author.

Early life
Adams was born in Alberta, Canada, but was a citizen of the United States. She is the daughter of Mr. and Mrs. Wayne Adams. Raised Roman Catholic, she moved with her family to Burbank, California after the war where, as a teen, she competed in and won beauty contests before becoming an actress. She began working as a model while she was a student at Valley State College.

Adams, who initially wanted to become a doctor, had a weekend job in a dress shop while she worked during the week as secretary to a Superior Court judge in Los Angeles. When the dress shop had a fashion show televised, Adams modeled some of the dresses. An advertising man saw her modeling on that broadcast and invited her to make a commercial at a local television station. Ozzie Nelson was at the station at the same time, and he invited her to play a bit part in an episode of The Adventures of Ozzie and Harriet.

Acting

Adams appeared in various guest roles in television series of the 1960s, including a recurring role on the Dr. Kildare TV series. She was selected for Columbia Pictures' New Talent Program and was signed to a contract where she appeared on several Screen Gems television series and several films, including the recurring role of Lovey Kravezit in the Matt Helm movies starring Dean Martin.

After appearing uncredited in two films with Elvis Presley, Roustabout and Girl Happy, she played the redheaded Cassandra in How to Stuff a Wild Bikini

During her retirement from acting, Adams, going by her married name of Beverly Sassoon published several books and served as a spokeswoman for Vidal Sassoon, Inc.

She launched her own line of pet care products, Beverly Sassoon Pet Care System.

Personal life

Adams met hairstylist Vidal Sassoon when she was sent to his London salon while she was filming Torture Garden. They married on February 16, 1967, and Adams retired from acting, after fulfilling a commitment to appear in Irving Allen's Hammerhead, to raise the couple's children.

They had four children: daughter Catya, an actress who died from a drug-induced heart attack; son Elan BenVidal ; son David; and daughter Eden Sassoon. In 1981, the couple divorced and Adams returned to acting. She married a matador, Antonio Migoni, but the marriage was annulled. Adams later married Philip Neal, whom she described as "the love of my life". Neal died in 2004. In November 2022, Adams was profiled in Classic Images where she discussed her onscreen career.

Filmography

Awards nominations

References

External links

Living people
20th-century American actresses
Actresses from Burbank, California
Actresses from Edmonton
American film actresses
American television actresses
American women writers
Canadian emigrants to the United States
Canadian film actresses
Canadian television actresses
20th-century Canadian women writers
Writers from California
Writers from Edmonton
21st-century American women
Year of birth missing (living people)